The 2022 Arizona State Treasurer election took place on November 8, 2022, to elect the State Treasurer of Arizona, concurrently with other federal and state elections. Incumbent Republican Treasurer Kimberly Yee initially ran for governor, but suspended her campaign on January 15, 2022, and ran for re-election as the Republican nominee. The Democratic nominee was State Senator Martín Quezada.

Republican primary

Candidates

Declared
Bob Lettieri, former treasurer of the Arizona Republican Party
Jeff Weninger, state representative for the 17th district
Kimberly Yee, incumbent state treasurer

Withdrew
Regina Cobb, state representative from the 5th district (endorsed Weninger)
David Livingston, state senator from the 22nd district (running for state representative)

Endorsements

Polling

Results

Democratic primary

Candidates

Declared
Martín Quezada, state senator from the 29th district

Results

General election

Polling

Results

See also
2022 Arizona elections

Notes

Partisan clients

References

External links
Official campaign websites
Martín Quezada (D) for State Treasurer
Kimberly Yee (R) for State Treasurer

State Treasurer
Arizona